Amor Ben Taher (born January 1, 1969) is a retired Tunisian footballer. He played as middle forward.

Amor Ben Taher is a former player for the Océano Club de Kerkennah as well as the Club Sportif Sfaxien in 1995 and 1999. He won the Confederation Cup in 1998.

Amor Ben Tahar played twelve times for the Tunisia national football team and scored twice: first on February 22, 1992, against Nigeria (1–1), and then on October 17, 1993, against Iceland in a 3–1 victory.

Notes

External links
 
 

1969 births
Living people
Tunisian footballers
Tunisia international footballers
CS Sfaxien players
Tunisian Ligue Professionnelle 1 players
Association football forwards
Océano Club de Kerkennah players